The Departmental Council of Haute-Savoie is the deliberative assembly of the French department of Haute-Savoie. It consists of 34 members (departmental councilors) from 17 cantons and its headquarters are in Annecy, capital of the department.

Executive

President 
The president of the departemental council of Haute-Savoie was Christian Monteil (DVD), since 2008. He was re-elected president of the departmental council after the 2015 departmental elections. Following the 2021 departmental elections, Martial Saddier (LR) succeeded him as head of the council.

Vice-presidents (as of 2021)

References 

Haute-Savoie
Haute-Savoie